Vollenweider is a Swiss surname:
A topographic name for someone who lives by a field named as being a pasture reserved for foals, from Middle High German vole ‘foal’ (plural volen) + weide ‘meadow’, ‘pasture’.

Andreas Vollenweider (born 1953), Swiss musician
Hans Vollenweider (1908–1940), criminal and last person to be sentenced to death and executed in Switzerland
Jim Vollenweider (1939–1998), American football halfback
Richard Vollenweider (1922–2007), Swiss-born Canadian limnologist
Rodolfo Vollenweider (1917–2009), Argentine sailor

Surnames of Swiss origin